KDUX-FM (104.7 FM) is a radio station broadcasting a classic rock music format. Licensed to Hoquiam, Washington, United States, the station is currently owned by Alpha Media LLC, through Alpha Media Licensee LLC.

References

External links

DUX-FM
Classic rock radio stations in the United States
Radio stations established in 1987
Alpha Media radio stations